State Route 305 (SR 305) is a north-south state highway, although it goes in a more northwest-southeast direction, in Meigs and McMinn counties of East Tennessee.

Route description

SR 305 begins in McMinn County in downtown Athens at an intersection with SR 30 and SR 39. It goes north through neighborhoods along Ingleside Avenue to have an intersection with US 11/SR 2. The highway then turns northwest to leave Athens and have an interchange with I-75 at exit 52. It continues northwest through farmland and rural areas to cross into Meigs County. It continues northwest through farmland before coming to an end at an intersection with SR 68. The entire route of SR 305 is a two-lane highway.

Major intersections

References

305
Transportation in McMinn County, Tennessee
Transportation in Meigs County, Tennessee